Bern Bümpliz Süd railway station is a railway station in the district of Bümpliz-Oberbottigen within the municipality of Bern, in the Swiss canton of Bern. It is an intermediate stop on the standard gauge Lausanne–Bern line of Swiss Federal Railways. Bern Bümpliz Nord railway station is located on the Bern–Neuchâtel line.

Services 
The following services stop at Bern Bümpliz Süd:

 Bern S-Bahn:

References

External links 
 
 

Railway stations in the canton of Bern
Swiss Federal Railways stations
Buildings and structures in Bern